Stanley Robert West was a male athlete who competed for England.

Athletics career
He competed for England in the high jump at the 1934 British Empire Games in London.

West was the 1935 AAA champion.

References

English male high jumpers
Athletes (track and field) at the 1934 British Empire Games
Commonwealth Games competitors for England